Peter Metcalf (born February 25, 1979) is an American former ice hockey player who played eight seasons of professional hockey in the American Hockey League and ECHL from 2002–10. He was selected by the Toronto Maple Leafs in the 9th round (267th overall) of the 1999 NHL Entry Draft.

Awards and honors

References

External links

1979 births
Alaska Aces (ECHL) players
American men's ice hockey defensemen
Florida Everblades players
Idaho Steelheads (ECHL) players
Living people
Providence Bruins players
Toronto Maple Leafs draft picks
Trenton Titans players
Utah Grizzlies (AHL) players
Ice hockey players from Massachusetts
Maine Black Bears men's ice hockey players
AHCA Division I men's ice hockey All-Americans
NCAA men's ice hockey national champions